It is a 1978 board game published by Attack International.

Gameplay
It is a wargame in which a huge robot tank attacks an outpost defended by a force of smaller units.

Reception
Andy Davis reviewed It in The Space Gamer No. 35. Davis commented that "When I scrutinized It, I considered burning it outright. [...] I have to say that every gamer should stay far, far away from It."

External Links

References

Board games introduced in 1978